The Sauber C4 was the fourth sports prototype racing car that Swiss Peter Sauber designed and developed. It was built in 1975. It competed in the European 2-Litre Sportscar Championship, where it managed to score 1 win and 5 podium finishes. It was powered by the same naturally aspirated  Ford-Cosworth BDG four-cylinder engine as its predecessor, developing .

References

Rear-wheel-drive vehicles
Mid-engined cars
Sports prototypes
Cars introduced in 1975
Cars of Switzerland
Sauber Motorsport